Joe "Joey" Mazzola (born April 13, 1961) is a  guitarist, songwriter, music educator and visual artist and is probably best known as a founding member of the American rock band, Sponge. Joe was the original Sponge guitarist and played with the band for nine years. He is also a former member of The Detroit Cobras, whom he played with for 6-1/2 years, and The Sugarcoats.

Career
A Detroit native, Mazzola spent five of the hardest years of his life (1987-1992), on the Los Angeles club circuit. Having recorded with some of the top bands in Detroit and around the world, Joe continues his enigmatic musical career, recording and playing clubs and venues locally and abroad.
Mazzola is part of the guitar teaching staff at Berkley Music in Berkley, Michigan, a suburb of Detroit, where he has been working for several years. Some of his students have gone on to play in well-known bands.
 
Only recently has this musician branched off into the art world: as a three-dimensional artist and sculptor. Using reclaimed and recycled metals and materials, he set up a studio in his East English Village home and Eastworks Detroit was born. Joe began experimenting with a combination of iron, brass and copper pipes as well as glass and wood, creating an entire body of work. Designing fun and functional lamps and lighting from such items as mid-century modern fans, Joey's work is quirky and unique and has been very well received. He has exhibited in several top Detroit area galleries and art events and has developed a large following.

Personal life
Joe attended Mount Clemens (Michigan) High School.  He has one daughter, Rose Mazzola, and one granddaughter, Giavanna (Gia). Rose is a musician in her own right, having been a member of The Distillers. Rose and Gia currently live in Florida. Joe continues to live and work in Detroit.

External links
 Joey Mazzola Facebook
 Eastworks Detroit Facebook
 EastWorks Detroit Etsy

References 

 

American people of Italian descent
American rock guitarists
American male guitarists
Musicians from Detroit